Ancilla, common name the ancillas, is a genus of sea snails, marine gastropod mollusks in the family Ancillariidae.

Species
Species within the genus Ancilla include:
 Ancilla acuminata (G.B. Sowerby II, 1859)
 Ancilla adelphe Kilburn, 1981
 Ancilla albisulcata (G.B. Sowerby I, 1830)
 Ancilla albozonata E.A. Smith, 1904
 Ancilla ampla (Gmelin, 1791)
 Ancilla atimovatae Kantor, Fedosov, Puillandre & Bouchet, 2016
 Ancilla aureocallosa (Kilburn & Jenner, 1977)
 Ancilla boschi Kilburn, 1980
 Ancilla castanea (G.B. Sowerby I, 1830)
 Ancilla chrysoma Kilburn, 1981
 Ancilla cinnamomea Lamarck, 1801
 Ancilla culierei Cossignani & Quiquandon, 2019
 Ancilla djiboutina (Jousseaume, 1894)
 Ancilla eburnea (Deshayes, 1830)
 Ancilla exigua (G.B. Sowerby I, 1830)
 Ancilla farsiana Kilburn, 1981
 Ancilla faustoi H.R. Matthews, H.C. Matthews & Muniz Dijck, 1979
 Ancilla giaquintoi Bozetti, 2006
 Ancilla guttata Boyer, 2015
 Ancilla inornata (E.A. Smith, 1879)
 Ancilla iota Kilburn, 1981
 Ancilla kaviengensis Kantor, Fedosov, Puillandre & Bouchet, 2016
 Ancilla lhaumeti Kantor, Fedosov, Puillandre & Bouchet, 2016
 Ancilla lineolata (A. Adams, 1853)
 Ancilla marmorata (Reeve, 1864)
 Ancilla matthewsi Burch & Burch, 1967
 Ancilla minima Thiele, 1925
 Ancilla morandii Cossignani, 2019
 Ancilla morrisoni Kantor, Fedosov, Puillandre & Bouchet, 2016
 Ancilla murrayi Kilburn, 1981
 Ancilla ordinaria E.A. Smith, 1906
 Ancilla ovalis (G.B. Sowerby II, 1859)
 Ancilla pruinosa Boyer, 2015
 Ancilla reboriae Poppe, Tagaro & Goto, 2018
 Ancilla rouillardi Kilburn, 1981
 Ancilla sarda (Reeve, 1864)
 Ancilla scaphella (G.B. Sowerby II, 1859)
 Ancilla sticta Kilburn, 1981
 Ancilla suavis Yokoyama, 1926 
 Ancilla sultana Boyer, 2015
 Ancilla taylori Kilburn, 1981
 Ancilla testudae (Kilburn, 1977)
 Ancilla thomassini Kilburn, 1981
 Ancilla tronsoni (G.B. Sowerby II, 1859)
 Ancilla undulata Boyer, 2015
 Ancilla ventricosa (Lamarck, 1811)
 Species brought into synonymy 
 Ancilla agulhasensis Thiele, 1925: synonym of Ancilla ordinaria E.A. Smith, 1906
 Ancilla alba Perry, 1811: synonym of Buccinanops vittatum (Linnaeus, 1767)
 Ancilla coccinea Fischer, 1807: synonym of Ancilla cinnamomea Lamarck, 1801
 Ancilla coccinea Hedley, 1914: synonym of Amalda coccinata Kilburn, 1980
 Ancilla edgariana Schepman, 1911: synonym of Amalda edgariana (Schepman, 1911)
 Ancilla fasciata Reeve, 1864: synonym of Ancilla ordinaria E.A. Smith, 1906
 Ancilla lineata Perry, 1811: synonym of Nassarius glans glans (Linnaeus, 1758)
 Ancilla maculata Perry, 1811: synonym of Babylonia areolata (Link, 1807)
 Ancilla mauritiana G.B. Sowerby I, 1830: synonym of Anolacia mauritiana (G.B. Sowerby I, 1830)
 Ancilla muscae Pilsbry, 1926: synonym of Ancillista muscae (Pilsbry, 1926)
 Ancilla optima G.B. Sowerby III, 1897: synonym of Amalda optima (G.B. Sowerby III, 1897)
 Ancilla ordinaria major Turton, 1932: synonym of Ancilla albozonata E.A. Smith, 1904
 Ancilla oryza Reeve, 1864: synonym of Ancilla lineolata (A. Adams, 1853)
 Ancilla osculata Sowerby, 1900: synonym of Bullia osculata (Sowerby, 1900)
 Ancilla pallida Perry, 1811: synonym of Babylonia spirata (Linnaeus, 1758)
 Ancilla pura Sowerby, 1892: synonym of Ancilla marmorata (Reeve, 1864)
 Ancilla rubiginosa : synonym of Amalda rubiginosa (Swainson, 1823) (original combination)
 Ancilla sumatrana Thiele, 1925: synonym of Ancillina sumatrana (Thiele, 1925)

References

External links
 

 
Ancillariidae